Gibberula goodallae is a species of sea snail, a marine gastropod mollusk, in the family Cystiscidae. It is named after British primatologist Jane Goodall.

Description
The length of the shell attains 1.92 mm.

Distribution
This marine species occurs off Guadeloupe.

References

goodallae
Gastropods described in 2015